The Southeast Asian University of Technology (SEAUTech), formerly known as the Bicol State College of Applied Sciences and Technology (BISCAST), is a public state college, nonsectarian in the Philippines. It is located along Peñafrancia Avenue in Naga City. The current president is Alex H. Navarroza.

History
Its history traces its humble beginnings in 1911, when it started as the Camarines Sur Trade School (CSTS). Mr. Pedro Hidalgo organized trade courses in the intermediate level, offering carpentry, drawing and trade arts. Classes were first held at the library hall of the Camarines Sur High School.

In 1924, it started offering vocational courses in the secondary level under Mr. Doroteo Federis. In November 1925, the first permanent school building was constructed, the Gabaldon building on its  school site donated by the provincial government. This building still exists and is considered as the school's historical landmark. Woodworking courses were also introduced during the term of Mr. Cornelio Casaclang, as Principal. At the outbreak of World War II, the school principal was Mr. Romulo Y. Mendoza.

In 1945, the school was reopened under Mrs. Primitiva Obias as Officer-in-Charge until the reassignment of Mr. Cornelio Casaclang, Auto- mechanics, Building Construction and Furniture and Cabinet Making were offered. In 1948, during the administration of Oligario Lenon, girl's trades courses in Dressmaking, Cosmetology and Food Trades were offered and with it the construction of buildings and shops by virtue of House Bill no. 2919 (R.A. 825), sponsored by Congressman Emilio Tible, and approved on August 15, 1952, the school was nationalized and renamed Camarines Sur National School of Arts and Trades (CSNSAT). Mr. Manuel T. Espinosa became its first Superintendent. In 1954, the two- year post- secondary trade- technical education was offered. Upon its conversion to a full-fledged college by virtue of R.A. No. 5056 sponsored by Cong. Ramon H. Felipe, Jr. on June 17, 1967, the CSNSAT was converted into a college and renamed as Bicol College of Arts and Trades (BCAT) and was authorized to offer courses like Bachelor of Science in Industrial Education (BSIE). This was during the term of Mr. Carlos Borjal, But before it formally assumed its name as BCAT, it was known as Camarines Sur National College of Arts and Trades (CSNCAT) until in the mid-1980s when it adapted its name BCAT. Tertiary level was immensely expanded to cover other fields of trade- technical education, thus the Bachelor of Science in Industrial Technology (BSIT) was opened in 1977. Under the Technical– Vocational Education Project (TVEP), it was selected as one of the pilot Technician Education Institutes (TEI) for Region V, by the Ministry of Education, Culture and Sports (MECS). The education component of the project was operationalized in school year 1984–1985, by the offering of the two- year Diploma in Industrial Technician (DIT) curriculum, with four major fields of specialization namely automotive, mechanical, electrical, and refrigeration and air conditioning technologies. In 1984, Dr. Pacita S. Yorobe temporarily headed the school. Five months later, on April 1, 1985, Superintendent Augusto R. Nieves took over the second alumnus to achieve such status. In 1988, by virtue of DECS Order no. 39, s. 1988, the Teacher-Education component was expanded through the offering of the Bachelor of Secondary Education (BSEd), major in Technology and Home Economics (THE), Mathematics, English and Physics; and Bachelor of Science in Elementary Education (BEEd) with the area of specialization in Home Economics and Livelihood Education (HELE). Under the administration of Mr. Honesto T. Aguilar, the fifth School Superintendent, BCAT started its offering of Engineering courses namely: Electrical Engineering (BSEE) Electronics and Communications Engineering (BSECE), Mechanical Engineering (BSME) and Bachelor of Science in architecture (BSA). The institution had first Engineering and Architecture graduates last March, 2001 and until now had steadily produced board passers and board topnotchers. BCAT continued its bid for excellence in technology and teacher education under Mr. Pedro F. Moreno, the sixth Superintendent of the college. It remained undefeated during the annual Skills Olympic among TECHVOC schools in the Region. Its students maintained its dominance in the FFP-FAHP contests for high school students. In December 2000, pursuant to Republic Act 8760, on the integration of CHED Supervised Institution (CSI's) to State Universities and College (SUC's), the Bicol College of Arts and Trades was integrated to the Camarines Sur Polytechnic Colleges (CSPC) in Nabua, Camarines Sur with Dr. Lourdes B. Laniog as its president and Dr. Amparo A. Nieves as the Campus Director. In the Naga Campus.

On July 1, 2002, Dr. Monsito G. Ilarde, was appointed College President. Within the first month of his presidency, he effected the integration of BCAT to Camarines Sur Polytechnic College (CSPC), with Dr. Alejandro R. Cortez as the new Campus Director until October 2003, when the position was reverted to Dr. Nieves, until her retirement in 2006. To date, pursuant to CSPC Board of Trustees Resolution No. 00-044, the former BCAT became CSPC Naga Campus. On October 19, 2012, President Benigno S. Aquino III signed Republic Act No. 1110231 separating CSPC Naga Campus and converting it into Bicol State College of Applied Sciences and Technology (BISCAST). The CSNCAT, the BCAT, CSPC- Naga Campus, and now BISCAST, has survived 104 years as an institution of learning and served generations of Bikolanos. It remains to this day, a premier source of Vocational Technology and Teacher Education. With the spirit and dynamism of its present leaders and staff, it will continue to grow, serve and pursue its goals and commitment to the people of Bicol.

Administration

Administrative council

Academics

Graduate school programs
Master of Engineering (major in Electronics Engineering)
Master of Arts in Teaching major in Technology and Livelihood Education with specialization in Home Economics
Master of Arts in Education (Major in English Language Teaching, Mathematics, Science)
Doctor of Education in Science Education 
Doctor of Education in Language Education 
Doctor of Philosophy in Mathematics Education

Undergraduate programs

College of Engineering and Architecture

Bachelor of Science in Architecture
Bachelor of Science in Electronics and Communications Engineering
Bachelor of Science in Electrical Engineering
Bachelor of Science in Mechanical Engineering
Bachelor of Science in Civil Engineering

College of Education

Bachelor of Elementary Education
Bachelor of Secondary Education major in Mathematics
Bachelor of Secondary Education major in Science
Bachelor of Secondary Education major in English
Bachelor in Technology and Livelihood Education (major in Home Economics)
Bachelor in Technical-Vocational Teacher Education

College of Trades and Technology
BS in Industrial Education major in Automotive
BS in Industrial Education major in Drafting Technology
BS in Industrial Education major in Electrical Technology
BS in Industrial Education major in Food Technology
BS in Industrial Education major in Garment Technology
BS in Industrial Education major in Industrial Arts
BS in Industrial Education major in Mechanical Technology

College of Arts and Science

Bachelor of Science in Entertainment and Multimedia Computing major in Digital Animation
Bachelor of Science in Exercise and Sport Sciences
Bachelor of Science in Food Technology
Bachelor of Science in Entrepreneurship

Abolished programs

Secondary Trade School Curriculum (Laboratory High School)
Cadet Corps Preparatory Military Training (CCPMT)

Student life

Recreation and wellness
BISCAST runs various recreation and wellness programs. These programs, like the annual intramural activities, are made with the aim of developing the total well-being of its members, catering to their other skills/abilities and offer an avenue for its members to socially interact with each other while improving their physique and/or just enjoying their interests. The institution is home for different sports clubs which cater to the varied interests of the students, faculty and staff. They can also participate in the dance fitness program called Zumba. Facilities such as the student pavilion are also always open to cater for these purposes.

Career services
Students can seek consultation on their career choices and plans to help them align it in their interests and goals.

Cadet Corps National Service Training Program (CCNSTP)

This is the organization of students who undergo National Service Training Program under Reserve Officer Training Corps component as optional and voluntary pursuant to Republic Act No. 9163 or the NSTP Act of 2001. The training and administration of the Cadet Corps is administered by 502nd (CAS) Community Defense Center, 5th Regional Community Defense Group, Army Reserve Command of Philippine Army. Graduates of Basic ROTC program will be enlisted to the reserve force of the Philippine Army pursuant to Republic Act No. 7077 while students who choose deferment from military training and opted to take the two other components of NSTP Program will be registered to National Service Reserve Corps.

References

External links
Bicol State College of Applied Sciences and Technology
Page

Universities and colleges in Bicol Region

Universities and colleges in Naga, Camarines Sur
Educational institutions established in 1911
1911 establishments in the Philippines